The Reluctant Fundamentalist is a 2012 political thriller drama film directed by Mira Nair and starring Riz Ahmed, Kate Hudson, and Liev Schreiber. It is based on the 2007 novel of the same name by Mohsin Hamid. The film is a post-9/11 story about the impact of the terrorist attacks on one Pakistani man and his treatment by Americans in reaction to them.

In 2007, Nair read the manuscript of Hamid's unpublished novel. After reading it, she decided to make a film. Her production house, Mirabai Films, and Nair's long-time partner, producer Lydia Dean Pilcher's production company, Cine Mosaic, optioned the film rights to the novel.

The film premiered as the opening film for the 69th Venice International Film Festival, and at the 37th Toronto International Film Festival. The film had a limited release in the United States on 26 April 2013, by IFC Films. In Pakistan, the film was released in Urdu with a changed title as Changez on 24 May 2013. The film also screened at the 31st Munich International Film festival. The film won the "Centenary Award" at the 43rd International Film Festival of India. Upon its release, the film received mixed reviews from critics and was a box office bomb, earning only $2.1 million worldwide on a $15 million budget. The film received several awards, many of them honoring the film's efforts to address tolerance and xenophobia.

Plot 
Anse Rainier, an American professor at Lahore University, is kidnapped and held for ransom. Bobby Lincoln, an American journalist in Pakistan, arranges to interview Rainer’s colleague Changez Khan, who he suspects is involved in the kidnapping.

Meeting Lincoln at a café, Changez declares his admiration for America’s "level playing fields" (though he's shown playing soccer on an immaculately lawned field as he says this, equal opportunities for economic advancement is the obvious implication). His father is a respected poet, but money was always difficult for the family and Changez was only able to attend Princeton University on a scholarship. After graduating, he joins a top Wall Street valuation firm, Underwood Samson, and starts a relationship with an American photographer, Erica.

In Manila on business during the September 11 attacks, Changez returns to the US and is quickly picked out, then invasively strip-searched at the airport, leaving him furious at being unfairly targeted/treated. Leaving work, he is further mistakenly arrested and interrogated by federal agents. His relationship with Erica is strained, largely because she feels responsible for the death of her former boyfriend in a drunk-driving accident and still feels as though she's cheating on him. At the opening of Erica’s art show, Changez is angered to discover she has used intimate details of their relationship in her art, and breaks up with her.

Valuating a publishing house in Istanbul, Changez learns that the firm is financially worthless. He is also surprised to discover (from firm's owner) that his father's work/poems were translated into Turkish – he is given a copy of the published book. He has a change of heart and refuses to close down the company, infuriating his boss and mentor Jim Cross. Changez resigns from Underwood Samson.

During his interview with Lincoln, Changez says he was approached by a terrorist cell to become a mujahid and was tempted to accept, angry and disillusioned by "the arrogance, the blindness, the hypocrisy" of the US. He refused when told about the "fundamental truths" of the Quran, echoing a phrase from Jim Cross during their first encounter, "focusing on the fundamentals." Changez explains that both Islamic fundamentalists and blind capitalists like Underwood Samson similarly simplify and exploit people for their own means.

Changez’s visa expires and he returns home to Lahore and is hired as a university lecturer, as departing foreign professors have left vacancies. He voices dissatisfaction with US intrusions in Pakistan, bringing him to the attention of the authorities, who raid his office and home, threatening his family. Lincoln is seen nearby, and Changez reveals that he knows Lincoln is working for the CIA, (having taken a photograph of him surveilling when Changez's office was raided previously) and deducing that Rainier was the one who recruited him.

As Lincoln and Changez talk in the café, protestors gather outside, and Lincoln is pressured by his superiors to learn Rainier’s location and complete "turning his target". The protests grow hostile, and Changez mentions he has heard of a butcher shop and discloses the address of a possible location. Contact is lost before the information can be phoned to Lincoln’s fellow operatives.

Changez raises Lincoln’s suspicions by texting, but says he was communicating with his sister, Bina. Furious at receiving a picture of Rainer dead, Lincoln blames Changez and demands to see his phone. Holding Changez at gunpoint, Lincoln uses him as a shield in the crowd of his protester students. The crowd destabilizes and Lincoln falls, accidentally shooting and killing Changez’s "brother" Sameer. Another student fires at Lincoln, wounding him, and Lincoln is quickly removed by CIA agents, learning that Rainer was found dead that morning and Changez had told the truth – he had no involvement. Checking his phone, he confirms the text was indeed sent to his sister.

Changez delivers a eulogy at Sameer's funeral, as Lincoln recuperates in a hospital, recalling Changez's words as he listens to the recording of the interview – "Looks can be deceiving. I am a lover of America... although I was raised to feel very Pakistani"... .

Cast

Music

The soundtrack album for The Reluctant Fundamentalist was composed by Michael Andrews. On selecting Andrews, Nair said: "I called him up from Delhi. We didn't waste time and were very direct. I asked him how far east he had traveled and he said, 'San Diego!' And I just started laughing." He layered the film's score with traditional Pakistani songs.

The album has Urdu poetry set to music, Pakistani pop, funk and rap music, vocals from Amy Ray of the folk group Indigo Girls, and a new original song from Peter Gabriel, an old friend of Nair's. The film uses an eight-minute duet called "Kangna", sung by Fareed Ayaz and Abu Mohammed, for the opening scene. Songs based on the poems of Faiz Ahmed Faiz were used in the film and performed by Atif Aslam and Michael Andrews (English lyrics). Mira said: "His poems are put to music and we composed new versions of his poems. I went back to Pakistan and found Atif Aslam, the Kanye West of Pakistan, who is the nation's biggest pop star."

On composing music for the film, Andrews said: "She has great relationships with folks in the region, and because I was so far away, Mira took care of it. I sent her my music to be overdubbed with melodies represented and she actually recorded Bansuri flute, and also took care of the vocals on 'Mori Araj Suno'. Simultaneously, I added Alam Khan, Ali Akbar's son, and Salar Nadir. Then I put the tracks under the vocal and the orchestra under the mock-up and real Bansuri." This all took place over the Internet, through endless uploading and downloading. "Most of our discussions took place after Mira had worked a 16-hour day."

Andrews served as the primary composer for the music, but some of the songs and music were composed by others. Atif Aslam, Fareed Ayaz, Fahad Humayun, Abu Muhammad, and Amy Ray also served as singers and secondary composers on the album. Nair cast the popular Pakistani singer Meesha Shafi to play the role of Changez's sister, who sings "Bijli Aaye Ya Na Aaye".

The soundtrack was released on Amazon for digital download on 30 April 2013. Internationally, Knitting Factory has released the soundtrack album. In India, Universal Music Group India hold the rights to release the music. Both physical and digital formats of the album were released on 30 April 2013, exclusively on Universal Music.

Release

Initial screening
IFC Films and Cathay-Keris Films co-financed The Reluctant Fundamentalist, with IFC Films handling the North American distribution and Cathay handling the international release. The film had its premieres at 69th Venice International Film Festival and at the 37th Toronto International Film Festival in late 2012. In Venice, Nair said she hoped the film reflected the fact that "the modern Pakistan is nothing like what you read in the papers" and that she hoped to bring "some sense of bridge-making, some sense of healing, basically a sense of communication that goes beyond the stereotype".

Worldwide screening
The film screened in festivals in the United States, Denmark, Venice, Toronto, London, Sweden, and Munich in early 2013. It was released in the United States on 26 April 2013, in India and Canada on 17 May 2013, and in the United Kingdom on 19 May 2013. In Pakistan, the film was released in Urdu as Changez on 24 May by Express Entertainment.

Reception

Box office
The Reluctant Fundamentalist earned $30,920 in its opening weekend in limited release in the United States, and went on to gross a total of $528,731. Its worldwide gross was $2,167,020. In India, the film was released in 300 theaters by PVR Limited and grossed $273,299. In its opening weekend in Sweden, the gross revenue was $12,286.

Critical response

The Reluctant Fundamentalist received mixed reviews from critics. , the film holds a 57% approval rating on review aggregation website Rotten Tomatoes based on 99 reviews, with an average rating of 6.10/10. The website's critical consensus reads: "The Reluctant Fundamentalist is technically proficient with solid acting and cinematography, but its message is so ambitious and heavy-handed that some of its power is robbed." At Metacritic, which assigns a weighted mean rating out of 100, the film has a score of 54, based on 28 reviews from film critics, classified as a generally favorably reviewed film.

J.R. Jones of Chicago Reader said, "This sure-handed adaptation of Mohsin Hamid's international best seller shows Nair at her best." Vaihayasi Pande Daniel for Rediff.com gave three-and-a-half out of five stars and says "The Reluctant Fundamentalist has its cinematic moments but is too simplistic in places". Peter Bradshaw in The Guardian gave it three out of five stars and commented, "Its message might be flabby, but Mira Nair's adaptation of Mohsin Hamid's novel is still a bold piece of global storytelling".

Rummana Ahmed from Yahoo! Movies gave a score of four out of five stating, "Mira Nair takes on the daunting task of adapting Mohsin Hamid's The Reluctant Fundamentalist and skillfully transforms a monologue into an engaging plot. She weaves an elaborate tale, infusing it with warmth and texture." Damon Wise of Empire Magazine rated the film as three out of five and said, "Ahmed excels and the set-up is compelling but ultimately this is middle rank stuff from the Monsoon Wedding director".

Mohar Basu of Koimoi also rated the film three out of five stars and says: "What's Good: The film preserves the mood of Mohsin Hamid's book well. What's Bad: A jerky screenplay ruptures the film's flow multiple times all through. Watch or Not?: Mira Nair's repertoire glistening with gems like Namesake and Monsoon Wedding is enough to evoke interest. However, The Reluctant Fundamentalist is not even close to being among her best works. With issues left unexplored and characters abandoned abruptly, the film is a desirable watch only for the landmark performance of Riz Ahmed and the grace with which he builds his character."

For the academic reception of the adaptation of The Reluctant Fundamentalist, see Mendes and Bennett (2016) and Lau and Mendes (2018), who question "how the ambivalence and provocativeness of the 'source' text translates into the film adaptation, and the extent to which the film format makes the narrative more palatable and appealing to wider audiences as compared to the novel's target readership."

Accolades
The Reluctant Fundamentalist won the Audience Favorite—World Cinema award at 2012 Mill Valley Film Festival, while Nair was honored with the Mill Valley Film Festival Award that year.

The Reluctant Fundamentalist won the 1st Centenary Award at 43rd International Film Festival of India.

The Reluctant Fundamentalist won Truly Moving Picture Award at the 2013 Heartland Film Festival.

The Reluctant Fundamentalist won Best Film of the Bernhard Wicki Film Award at the 2013 Munich Film Festival.

The Reluctant Fundamentalist won Best Narrative Feature of the Audience Awards at the 2013 CAAMFest.

In 2013, Nair won The Bridge, the German Film Award for Peace, for The Reluctant Fundamentalist. The award is given to film artists whose work builds bridges and inspires tolerance and humanitarianism.

References

External links
  – official site
 
 
 
 
 

2012 films
2012 thriller drama films
American political drama films
American political thriller films
Films based on the September 11 attacks
Thriller films based on actual events
Films based on Pakistani novels
Films based on mystery novels
2010s Urdu-language films
Films based on British novels
Insurgency in Khyber Pakhtunkhwa fiction
Wall Street films
Films directed by Mira Nair
Films scored by Michael Andrews
Films set in Pakistan
English-language Indian films
Films shot in Delhi
Films set in Istanbul
Films set in Lahore
Films set in Chile
Films set in Manila
Films shot in Atlanta
Qatari drama films
2012 drama films
2010s English-language films
2010s American films